Blood on the Terraces is Angelic Upstarts's eighth album, released in 1987.

Track listing
All tracks composed by Thomas Mensforth, Brian Hayes and Ronnie Rocker; except where noted
Side A
"Pride of Our Passion"
"Everyday"
"I Wanna Knighthood"
"Heart Attack in Paris"
"Four Grey Walls"

Side B
"I Don't Wanna Fight The Soviet"
"Our Day Will Come"
"Blood on the Terraces"
"Heroin Is Good For You"
"It's Our Life"
"Ruby (Don't Take Your Love to Town)" (Mel Tillis)

Personnel
Angelic Upstarts
Thomas "Mensi" Mensforth - lead vocals
Brian Hayes - guitar
Rick "Ronnie Rocker" Newson - bass
Martin "Max Splodge" Everest - drums
Technical
Russell Walker - sleeve design

References

1987 albums
Angelic Upstarts albums